Ivaylo Ivanov may refer to:
 Ivaylo Ivanov (footballer)
 Ivaylo Ivanov (judoka)